Gravere is a comune (municipality) in the Metropolitan City of Turin in the Italian region Piedmont, located about  west of Turin. Until 1713, it was the first commune in the Val di Susa in the Duchy of Savoy when coming from France, as the upper part of the valley was part of the latter kingdom.

References

External links
 Official website

Cities and towns in Piedmont